Landenne ) is a village of Wallonia and a district of the municipality of Andenne, located in the province of Namur, Belgium.

The village contains a church from the 18th century and a fortified farm from the 16th century.

References

External links

Former municipalities of Namur (province)
Sub-municipalities of Andenne